"Come On Papa" is a World War I era song released in 1918.

Sheet music 
Lyrics and music were written by Edgar Leslie and Harry Ruby. It was published by Waterson, Berlin & Snyder, Co. of New York, New York. Artist Albert Wilfred Barbelle designed the sheet music cover. It features a woman and an American soldier in an embrace, as the soldier is driving a car. A woman, soldier, and Frenchman look on, and a pedestrian runs out of the way. Below this image is an inset photo of Eddie Cantor. It states on the cover, "Successfully introduced by Wellington Cross."  It was written for voice and piano.  The sheet music can be found at Pritzker Military Museum & Library.

Recordings 
On January 30, 1919, Joseph C. Smith's Orchestra recorded the song in New York. It was released by Victor Records.  The song also appeared in the 1950 film Three Little Words.

Chorus
The song is about Sweet Marie in Paris. She likes to drive her car around and pick up Yankee boys. The chorus is as follows:

References

External links 
 View the song MP3 and sheet music here

Songs about Paris
1918 songs
Songs of World War I
Songs with music by Harry Ruby
Songs written by Edgar Leslie